Computer club or Computer Club may refer to:

 Computer club (user group), a computer users' group
 Computer Club (broadcast), a former German TV broadcast about computers
 Computer Club (band), a music band by Ashley Jones